Garai (surname)
 House of Garai, an old nobility from the Kingdom of Hungary
 Garai, Iran, a village in Kerman Province, Iran
 Garai, Biscay, a municipality in Spain

See also
 Garay (disambiguation)